Tolgahan is a Turkish given name for males. Notable people with the name include:

 Tolgahan Acar (born 1986), Turkish footballer
 Tolgahan Çiçek (born 1995), Dutch-born Turkish footballer 
 Tolgahan Sayışman (born 1981), Turkish film actor

Turkish masculine given names